Poienarii de Muscel is a commune in Argeș County, Muntenia, Romania. It is composed of five villages: Groșani, Jugur, Poienari (the commune center), Șerbănești and Valea Îndărăt.

References

Communes in Argeș County
Localities in Muntenia